Fred Gorham Folsom (November 9, 1873 – November 11, 1944) was an American football player, coach of football and baseball, lawyer, and law professor.  He served as the head football coach at the University of Colorado Boulder (1895–1899, 1901–1902, 1908–1915) and at Dartmouth College from (1903–1906), compiling a career college football record of 106–28–6.  Folsom played football at Dartmouth from 1892 to 1894.  He was also the head baseball coach at Colorado in 1898 and 1899, tallying a mark of 6–6.  Folsom practiced law in Denver and Boulder and taught at the University of Colorado Law School from 1905 to 1943.  The football stadium at the University of Colorado, originally named Colorado Stadium, was renamed as Folsom Field in his honor in 1944.

Early life and education
Folsom was born to Franklin W. Folsom and Lillian A. Hopkins in Old Town, Maine on November 9, 1873.  He graduated from Dartmouth in 1895 and earned an LLB from the University of Colorado in 1899.

Head coaching record

Football

See also
 List of college football head coaches with non-consecutive tenure

Notes

References

1871 births
1944 deaths
19th-century players of American football
American football ends
Colorado Buffaloes baseball coaches
Colorado Buffaloes football coaches
Dartmouth Big Green football coaches
Dartmouth Big Green football players
University of Colorado Law School alumni
University of Colorado faculty
People from Old Town, Maine
Coaches of American football from Maine
Players of American football from Maine
Baseball coaches from Maine
Colorado lawyers
Psi Upsilon